"Dust in the Wind" is a song recorded by American progressive rock band Kansas and written by band member Kerry Livgren, first released on their 1977 album Point of Know Return.

The song peaked at No. 6 on the Billboard Hot 100 the week of April 22, 1978, making it Kansas's only single to reach the top ten in the US. The 45-rpm single was certified Gold for sales of one million units by the RIAA shortly after the height of its popularity as a hit single. More than 25 years later, the RIAA certified Gold the digital download format of the song, which is Kansas' only single to be certified gold as of September 17, 2008.

Kansas version

Inspiration 
The title of the song is a Bible reference, paraphrasing Ecclesiastes:

A meditation on mortality and the inevitability of death, the lyrical theme bears a striking resemblance to the biblical passages Genesis 3:19 ("...for dust thou art, and unto dust shalt thou return.") and Ecclesiastes 3:20 ("All go to one place. All are from the dust, and to dust all return.").  The phrase "dust in the wind" occurs in Psalms 18:43 ("I ground [my enemies] like dust on the face of the wind...").  It is similar to the famous opening lines of the Japanese war epic The Tale of the Heike ("...the mighty fall at last, and they are as dust before the wind.") and from a book of Native American poetry, which includes the line "for all we are is dust in the wind."

Writing, recording and impact 

{| class="wikitable floatright" style="width: 365px"
! style="background: #F0E68C"|'Kansas band members comment on  the Top Ten success of "Dust in the Wind"
|-
|  Steve Walsh (in 1979): "I thought ['Dust in the Wind'] would be a hit from the very first. It [defies] the basic formulas - the Boston, Foreigner, Heart formula - that most [rock] groups try to follow. They don't realize that it's not the formula [that matters], it's the song."  Phil Ehart (in 1989): "We're a hard rock band that's known mostly for a ballad we did [over] ten years ago. We're an album band & it's a fluke [if any] of our songs was a hit single."   Rich Williams (in 2010): "Our hits are hits by accident. 'Dust in the Wind' & '[Carry On] Wayward Son' aren't formula songs. They were flukes." 
|}

Kerry Livgren devised what would be the guitar line for "Dust in the Wind" as a finger exercise for learning fingerpicking. His wife, Vicci, heard what he was doing, remarked that the melody was nice, and encouraged him to write lyrics for it. Livgren was unsure whether his fellow band members would like it, since it was a departure from their signature style. After Kansas had rehearsed all the songs intended for the band's recording sessions of June and July 1976, Livgren played "Dust in the Wind" for his bandmates, who after a moment's "stunned silence" asked: "Kerry, where has this been?" Kansas guitarist Rich Williams would recall that Livgren played his bandmates "a real rough recording of him playing ['Dust in the Wind'] on an old reel to reel. [He] just kind of mumbl[ed] the lyrics, [but] even [hearing it] in that bare form...we said: 'That's our next single.'"

Recorded at Woodland Studios in Nashville, "Dust in the Wind" featured Livgren playing a Martin D-28 acoustic guitar borrowed from Williams: highlighted by the electric violin work of Robby Steinhardt, the track featured Steve Walsh as lead vocalist despite being recorded after Walsh had given his immediately effective resignation to his bandmates (Walsh's 1977 "departure" from Kansas would last a month).

In fact passed over as lead single choice in favor of its parent album's title cut, "Dust in the Wind" began receiving radio airplay as an album track, factoring into the underperformance of the "Point of Know Return" single which dropped out of the Top 40 from its Billboard Hot 100 peak of No. 29 the week the rush-released single of "Dust in the Wind" debuted at No. 81 on the Hot 100 dated January 21, 1978. On the Hot 100 dated April 1, 1978 "Dust in the Wind" reached No. 10—besting the No. 11 peak of the 1977 Kansas breakout hit "Carry on Wayward Son"—rising to a Hot 100 peak of No. 6 with a total Top Ten tenure of seven weeks. "Dust in the Wind" would remain the all-time highest charting single for Kansas: of the group's five subsequent Top 40 hits, only two would reach the Top 20, "Play the Game Tonight" and "All I Wanted" having respective Hot 100 peaks of No. 17 and No. 19.Billboard praised the song's "evocative lyrics", "catchy melody" as well as the lead vocal performance and how the string instruments evoke the mood.  Cash Box said that it has "solid melody, excellent vocals and harmonies, and an impactful lyric."  Record World said that it "shows a new and pleasantly surprising side of [Kansas]," saying that "it's a subdued vocal duet accompanied only by acoustic guitars and an imaginative violin break."  Ultimate Classic Rock critic Eduardo Rivadavia rated "Dust in the Wind" as Kansas' 3rd greatest song, calling it "a stark and gentle lament that bridges the group’s transition from intimidating prog rockers to accessible hitmakers."  Classic Rock critic Dave Ling ranked it as Kansas' 2nd greatest song.

Kansas also released a live version of the "Dust in the Wind" on their album Two for the Show and a symphonic version on Always Never the Same.

Personnel
Steve Walsh – lead vocals
Kerry Livgren – acoustic guitar
Rich Williams – acoustic guitar
Robby Steinhardt – violin, viola, backing vocals
Phil Ehart – hand drums

Chart performance

Weekly charts

Year-end charts

Certifications

Adaptations

Sarah Brightman recorded "Dust in the Wind" for her 1998 album release Eden. Cited by some critics as an anachronistic item in the operatic pop singer's repertoire,Florida Today June 22, 2006 "Brightman Experiments With New Sounds in Eden" by Breuse Hickman p.TGIF13Minneapolis Star Tribune July 22, 1999 "Music: Sarah Brightman" by Jon Bream p.E13 the song was recorded at the suggestion of Eden's producer: Brightman's then personal partner Frank Peterson.

German rock band Scorpions covered the song on their 2001 live album Acoustica''.

During the 8888 Uprising, Naing Myanmar, a Burmese composer, penned "Kabar Makyay Bu" (ကမ္ဘာမကျေဘူး), rendered in English as "We Won’t Be Satisfied till the End of the World" as a protest song. Set to the tune of "Dust in the Wind," the song quickly gained popularity across the country, as an emotional appeal for freedom. The song was recorded and distributed on cassette tapes, reaching millions of Burmese eventually becoming an anthem of the 8888 Uprising. In the aftermath of the 2021 Myanmar coup d'etat, the country's nascent civil disobedience movement has revitalized this song, performing it during protests and acts of civil disobedience.

References

Kansas (band) songs
1977 songs
1978 singles
Sarah Brightman songs
Music videos directed by Bruce Gowers
American soft rock songs
Song recordings produced by Jeff Glixman
Songs written by Kerry Livgren
Ecclesiastes
Rock ballads
1970s ballads
Songs about death
Hebrew Bible in popular culture
Biblical topics in popular culture